Lars Michael Clausen (8 April 1935, Berlin – 20 May 2010, Hamburg) was a German sociologist and professor at the University of Kiel.

Life and work

During World War II, the family lived on the Darß (in Pomerania). 1944 his father Jürgen Clausen, a movie producer, was killed in action; his mother Rosemarie Clausen, a famous photographer, fled with her three children 1945 to Hamburg, where Lars Clausen attended the Christianeum. 1955, he took up Business, Economics, Sociology, and History at the universities of Berlin (the Free University), Cologne, and Hamburg. 1960, he took his first degree in business in Hamburg (Dipl.-Kfm.). He got both his doctorate (Dr.sc.pol.) and post-doctoral degree (Habilitation) at the University of Münster (1964 resp. 1968) in sociology, having done field work in Zambian industries, 1964—65. After academic teaching in Münster, Bielefeld, and The Hague, he was called 1970 to the chair of Sociology at Kiel University. Clausen inspired generations of students with his ingenuity and his ability to illustrate sociological theories with practical examples. He was considered by many to be one of the last polymaths, and his lectures had cult status among students. 

He specialized in the sociology of culture, of labor, and of disaster, and is chief editor of the Complete Works of Ferdinand Tönnies.

1993 to 1994, Clausen was Chairman of the German Society for Sociology. He served as well as President of the German Africa Society and as Chairman of the Schutzkommission of the German Ministry of Interior, 2003—2009. From 1978, he was President of the Ferdinand Tönnies Society.

Awards 
 2010: Prize for an outstanding scientific life's work, Deutsche Gesellschaft für Soziologie, Paulskirche
 1998: Bundesverdienstkreuz 1. Klasse [Cross of Merit 1. Class]
 1982: Bundesverdienstkreuz
 1955: Scheffelpreis

Select bibliography
See as well here:

Monographs and papers
1964: Elemente einer Soziologie der Wirtschaftswerbung, Opladen: Westdeutscher Verlag
1966: On attitudes towards industrial conflict in Zambian industry, African Social Research, (2), p. 260-268
1968:Industrialisierung in Schwarzafrika, Bielefeld
1971: “Industrial Man. The Zambian case of radical social change”, in: Heide Simonis/Udo E. Simonis (eds.), Socioeconomic development in dual economies, Munich, p. 97–124
1976: Jugendsoziologie'', Stuttgart: Kohlhammer
1978: Tausch, Munich: Kösel
1978: (with Volker von Borries, Karl Simons) Siedlungssoziologie, Munich: Kösel
1979: “The social dimension of the ergonomic approach”, in: J. H. van Loon et al. (eds.), Ergonomics in tropical agriculture and forestry, Wageningen, p. 58–64
1985: (with Bettina Clausen) Zu allem fähig. Versuch einer Sozio-Biographie zum Verständnis des Dichters Leopold Schefer, 2 vols., Frankfurt on Main: Bangert & Metzler
1988: Produktive Arbeit, destruktive Arbeit, Berlin/New York: Walter de Gruyter
1992: Social differentiation and the long-term origin of disasters; Natural Hazards, VI, 2, p. 181–190
1994: Krasser sozialer Wandel, Opladen: Leske + Budrich
1998: “The European revival of Tönnies”, C.A.U.S.A., Kiel, No. 26, p. 1–11
2003: (with Elke M. Geenen, Elísio Macamo) Entsetzliche soziale Prozesse, Münster: LIT

Selected editions
1975: with Bettina Clausen) Spektrum der Literatur, Gütersloh: Lexikothek, 15 eds. until 1990
1981: (with Franz Urban Pappi) Ankunft bei Tönnies, Kiel: Mühlau
1985: (with Volker von Borries, Wolf R. Dombrowsky, Hans-Werner Prahl) Tönnies heute, Kiel: Mühlau
1990: (with Carsten Schlüter) Renaissance der Gemeinschaft? Berlin: Duncker & Humblot
1990: (with Carsten Schlüter) Hundert Jahre “Gemeinschaft und Gesellschaft”, Opladen: Leske + Budrich
1995: Gesellschaften im Umbruch, Frankfurt on Main/New York: Campus
1998––  (chief ed.) Ferdinand Tönnies Gesamtausgabe, 24 vols., Berlin/New York: Walter de Gruyter
1998: (ed.) Ferdinand Tönnies Gesamtausgabe 22: 1932–1936, Berlin/New York: Walter de Gruyter
2005: (with Arno Bammé, Rolf Fechner), Öffentliche Meinung zwischen neuer Wissenschaft und neuer Religion, Munich/Vienna: Profil
2006: (with Uwe Carstens et al.), Neuordnung der Sozialen Leistungen, Norderstedt

Further reading
1995: Wolf R. Dombrowsky/Ursula Pasero (eds.), Wissenschaft, Literatur, Katastrophen. Festschrift zum sechzigsten Geburtstag von Lars Clausen, Opladen: Westdeutscher Verlag
2000: Günter Endruweit/Wolf R. Dombrowsky (eds.), Ein Soziologe und sein Umfeld'', Kiel: CAU
 Oliver Stenzel: "Ein fulminantes Feuerwerk zum Finale". In: Kieler Nachrichten, RedaktionsNetzwerk Deutschland (RND), 9. April 2015

Notes

German sociologists
1935 births
2010 deaths
Officers Crosses of the Order of Merit of the Federal Republic of Germany
Free University of Berlin alumni
University of Hamburg alumni
University of Münster alumni
Academic staff of the University of Kiel
University of Cologne alumni
Academic staff of Bielefeld University
Academic staff of the University of Münster
German male writers
African studies
Area studies